This was the first edition of Hong Kong Tennis Open.

Sabine Lisicki won the title, defeating Karolína Plíšková in the final, 7–5, 6–3.

Seeds

Draw

Finals

Top half

Bottom half

Qualifying

Seeds

Qualifiers

Lucky loser

Qualifying draw

First qualifier

Second qualifier

Third qualifier

Fourth qualifier

References
Main Draw
Qualifying Draw

External links

Hong Kong Tennis Open
Hong Kong Open (tennis)